Roman Sabler (born 4 September 1995) is a Slovak football player who plays as a forward for Sokol Lanžhot.

Club career

FC DAC 1904 Dunajská Streda
He made his professional debut for FK DAC 1904 Dunajská Streda against his former club FK AS Trenčín on 12 July 2014.

References

External links
 
 FC DAC 1904 Dunajská Streda profile
 Eurofotbal profile
 Roman Sabler at Futbalnet

1995 births
Living people
Slovak footballers
Slovak expatriate footballers
Slovakia youth international footballers
Slovakia under-21 international footballers
Association football forwards
AS Trenčín players
FC DAC 1904 Dunajská Streda players
FK Železiarne Podbrezová players
Spartak Myjava players
FC ŠTK 1914 Šamorín players
TJ Sokol Lanžhot players
Slovak Super Liga players
2. Liga (Slovakia) players
Czech Fourth Division players
Expatriate footballers in Austria
Slovak expatriate sportspeople in Austria
Expatriate footballers in the Czech Republic
Slovak expatriate sportspeople in the Czech Republic